Moubray Piedmont Glacier is a piedmont glacier filling the northern part of Moubray Bay, Antarctica, formed by the confluence of Moubray Glacier and of ice streams falling from the west side of the south end of Adare Peninsula. The greater part of it is probably afloat. It was named by the New Zealand Geological Survey Antarctic Expedition of 1957–58 for Moubray Bay.

References

Glaciers of Victoria Land
Borchgrevink Coast